The 5th Central Committee of the Communist Party of Cuba (CPC) was elected at the 5th CPC Congress in 1997.

Members

References

5th Central Committee of the Communist Party of Cuba
1997 establishments in Cuba
2011 disestablishments in Cuba